Episcepsis thetis is a moth of the family Erebidae. It was described by Carl Linnaeus in 1771. It is found in Panama and Venezuela.

Description
Upperside: Antennae black. Head and thorax black. On the neck are two small scarlet spots just above the eyes, and one on each side below them. Abdomen silvery shining blue, having a triangular black mark at the base. Anterior wings dirty black, immaculate; tips whitish. Posterior wings dirty black, with a white discoidal transparent cloud.

Underside: Breast and sides dirty black. Abdomen white; its sides and tip dirty black. Wings of the same colour as on the upperside.

References

External links

Euchromiina
Moths described in 1771
Descriptions from Illustrations of Exotic Entomology
Taxa named by Carl Linnaeus